Kobe Hetherington (born 11 March 1999) is an Australian professional rugby league footballer who plays as a  for the Brisbane Broncos in the NRL.

Background 
Hetherington was born in Sydney, New South Wales, Australia and was raised in Rockhampton, Queensland. His father Jason is a former Australian international  and Queensland representative.

He played his junior rugby league for the Rockhampton Brothers, Calliope Roosters and Gladstone Brothers. 

Hetherington attended The Cathedral College before being signed by the Brisbane Broncos.

Playing career

Early career
In 2015, Hetherington played for the Central Queensland Capras in the Cyril Connell Cup before moving up to their Mal Meninga Cup side in 2016. In 2017, he moved to Brisbane, playing for the Norths Devils in the Mal Meninga Cup and the Broncos in the NRL Under-20s competition.

In 2018 and 2019, he played for the Devils' Hastings Deering Colts side, captaining them in their 2018 Grand Final win over the Townsville Blackhawks. On 10 July 2019, he represented the Queensland under-20 team.

In 2020, Hetherington joined the Broncos' NRL squad on a development contract.

2021
Hetherington began the 2021 season playing for the Souths Logan Magpies in the Queensland Cup.
In Round 11 of the 2021 NRL season, Hetherington made his first grade debut for Brisbane against the Sydney Roosters in a 34-16 win. With only two first grade games under his belt, Hetherington scored his first try in the NRL against Melbourne at Suncorp Stadium.

In round 14, Hetherington was controversially sent off in Brisbane's 38-16 loss against the Canberra Raiders, Hetherington was later cleared and wasn't suspended from the incident.
In Round 16, Hetherington started his first NRL game at lock against the Cronulla-Sutherland Sharks in a 26-18 win. On the 7 July, Hetherington re-signed for two years remaining at the Brisbane Broncos till the end of 2023. Hetherington was awarded Rookie of the Year for the 2021 season at the Brisbane end of season awards. Hetherington made a total of 22 appearances for Brisbane in the 2022 NRL season as the club finished 9th on the table and missed the finals.

References

External links 
Brisbane Broncos profile

1999 births
Living people
Australian rugby league players
Brisbane Broncos players
Norths Devils players
Souths Logan Magpies players
Rugby league hookers
Rugby league locks
Rugby league players from Sydney